Brandi Younger, professionally known by her stage name Gripsta, is an Oakland-born female rapper and actress. Discovered by Ice-T at the age of 13, she was featured on song titled "Funky Gripsta" off of his 1993 album Home Invasion and later signed to Tuff Break/A&M Records in the 1990s. Her debut single "Pop Goz the 9"  was partially leaked in January 1994, its music video was directed by Ice-T. However Gripsta's debut single was never officially released. The Tuff Break label on A&M Records was dropped before her scheduled release date. She was later featured on Ice-T's seventh solo studio album The Seventh Deadly Sin, as well as numerous features on record label Def Jam's The Murder Squad album. She worked with many artists under that association including South Central Cartel, Spice 1 and Sh'killa.

Younger was also featured in a principal role in the movie Dangerous Minds in which she played one of the many troubled teens that actress Michelle Pfeiffer sought to reform. Other acting credits include a guest star appearance in the "Leaving the Life" episode of the CBS television show Promised Land, a semi popular spin-off of CBS more successful show Touched by an Angel.'.

Discography 
"Pop Goz The 9"/"Can't Fade This" (single) (Tuff Break Records, 1994)

Guest appearances
 "Funky Gripsta" (with Ice-T, from Home Invasion) (Rhyme $yndicate/Priority Records, 1993)
 "Knock On Wood" (with Sh'Killa, from Murder Squad Nationwide) (G.W.K. Records/DJ West, 1995)
 "Female Rydaz", "Now U Wanna Come Back (Reunited We're Not)" and "Whatever It Takes" (with Sh'Killa, from Gangstrez From Da Bay) (G.W.K. Records/Priority Records, 1996)
 "Hardcore" (with Ice-T, from The Seventh Deadly Sin) (Coroner/Roadrunner Records, 1999)
 "Squeeze On'em" (with T.W.D.Y., from Derty Werk) (Thump Street Records, 1999)
 "Nasty" (with Celly Cel, from Deep Conversation) (Realside Records, 2000)
 "Boss Bitches" (with T.W.D.Y., from Lead the Way) (Thump Street Records, 2000)

References

Living people
Gangsta rappers
American women rappers
21st-century American rappers
21st-century American women musicians
Year of birth missing (living people)
21st-century women rappers